Quintus Egrilius Plarianus was a Roman senator, who was active during the reigns of Antoninus Pius and Marcus Aurelius. He was suffect consul for one of the nundinia in the first half of AD 144, as the colleague of Lucius Aemilius Carus. Plarianus was the son of Marcus Acilius Priscus Egrilius Plarianus; he also is known to have had a sister, Egrilia M.f. Plaria. Although his family had its origins in Ostia, it is likely he spent most of his life in Rome.

Plarianus is known to have been governor of Moesia superior from c.152 to c.155  and proconsular governor of Africa. An inscription from Avitta Bibba (now in Tunisia) attests he was governor of that province in the year 159, with his son Quintus Egrilius Plarianus as his legate or assistant. While governing Africa, Plarianus received a letter from the literary figure Fronto, recommending one Julius Aquilinus for a job in his administration, praising the young man for his learning and eloquence.

References 

2nd-century Romans
Suffect consuls of Imperial Rome
Roman governors of Africa
Plarianus, Quintus Egrilius